Martin Stanislaus McQuade (19 October 1894 – 6 February 1957) was an Australian rules footballer who played with Melbourne in the Victorian Football League (VFL).

Notes

External links 

 

1894 births
1957 deaths
Australian rules footballers from Melbourne
Melbourne Football Club players
People from Dandenong, Victoria